The Battle of El Veladero was a battle of the War of Mexican Independence that occurred from 1810 through 30 April 1811 at Cerro El Veladero, Acapulco de Juárez. The battle was fought between royalist forces, loyal to the Spanish crown, commanded by Juan Antonio Fuentes, and Mexican rebels, commanded by José María Morelos and Rafael Valdovinos, fighting for independence from the Spanish Empire. The rebels won.

Context 
In 1811, José María Morelos arrived with his army to the area around Carácuaro, Michoacán de Ocampo and began to issue notices to the local population about the popular uprising initiated by Miguel Hidalgo, a movement Morelos himself had joined at Indaparapeo when he had previously met with Hidalgo. Hidalgo had named Morelos a lieutenant and commissioned him to operate in the south of the country where the important port city of Acapulco was situated. Upon his return to Carácuaro, Morelos raised his own army and traveled to the state of Guerrero to conduct his first military campaign which took place between October 1810 through August 1811.

The battle
With his stated intent to capture the strategic city of Acapulco de Juárez, Morelos decided that it was vital to take the high ground at the Cerro del Veladero as this mountain surrounded the entire port city. Morelos sent 700 men, under the command of Captain Rafael Valdovinos, to take the mountain. Valdovinos was unable to initially take the mountain and was dislodged by royalist forces, losing his position on the mountain. Whilst these actions were taking place, the Guerrero brothers, Bravo and Vicente, arrived at the battle and bolstered the rebel forces with their own soldiers.

The two sides took up strategic positions around El Valedero and Acapulco, with skirmishes occurring frequently between the two sides, until 30 April 1811 when the forces commanded by Morelos were able to overrun the mountaintop and force the Spanish forces to retreat.

References 

 The information on this page was translated from its Spanish equivalent.

El Veladero
El Veladero
History of Guerrero
El Veladero
El Veladero
1811 in New Spain
April 1811 events